Carl Anton Bjerknes (24 October 1825 – 20 March 1903) was a Norwegian mathematician and physicist. Bjerknes' earlier work was in pure mathematics, but he is principally known for his studies in hydrodynamics.

Biography
Carl Anton Bjerknes was born in Oslo, Norway. His father was Abraham Isaksen Bjerknes and his mother Elen Birgitte Holmen. Bjerknes studied mining at the University of Oslo, and after that mathematics at the University of Göttingen and the University of Paris. In 1866 he held a chair for applied mathematics and in 1869 for mathematics. Over a fifty-year time period,  Bjerknes taught mathematics at the University of Oslo and at the military college.

A pupil of Peter Gustav Lejeune Dirichlet, Gabriel Lamé and Augustin-Louis Cauchy Bjerknes worked for the rest of his life in the field of hydrodynamics. He tried to explain the electrodynamics of James Clerk Maxwell by hydrodynamical analogies and similarly he proposed a mechanical explanation of gravitation. Although he did not succeed in his attempts to explain all those things, his findings in the field of hydrodynamics were important. His experiments were shown at the first International Exposition of Electricity in Paris that ran from August 15, 1881 through to November 15, 1881 at the Palais de l'Industrie on the Champs-Élysées and at the Scandinavian naturalist meeting in Stockholm.

John Charles Fields the founder of the Fields Medal for outstanding achievement in mathematics had this to say about the great minds that Norway had produced since it gained independence:

International Exposition of Electricity
(W)hen at the 1881 Paris International Electric Exhibition, he (Carl Anton) and his son (Vilhelm Bjerknes), demonstrated instruments that reproduced hydrodynamic analogies, few observers could ignore these baffling phenomena. Such celebrities as Hermann von Helmholtz, Gustav Kirchhoff, William Thomson (Lord Kelvin), the Siemens brothers, and the Marquis of Salisbury visited the small Norwegian exhibit booth and watched with amazement as a system of pulsating spheres and similar devices appeared to reproduce well-known electric and magnetic phenomena. For many observers the Bjerknes apparatus seemed to illustrate that the mysterious nature of electricity could perhaps be revealed. British observers allegedly exclaimed, "Maxwell should have seen this!" Of the eleven diplômes d'honneur, seven went to non-French exhibitors, including Werner Siemens, Thomas Edison, Alexander Graham Bell and William Thomson. Professor Carl Anton Bjerknes, representing Norway, joined their ranks.

Family
On June 30, 1859, after returning from his foreign travels, Bjerknes married Wilhelmine Dorothea Koren (10.11.1837–21.10.1923) whose father was a minister in the Church in West Norway.  His son Norwegian physicist and meteorologist, Vilhelm Bjerknes continued the work of his father.

Death
Bjerknes died suddenly of a stroke on 20 March 1903 at the age of 77.

Selected works
 Niels Henrik Abel. En skildring af hans liv og videnskabelige virksomhed (Stockholm. 1880)

References

Other sources
 
 
 
 Author profile in the database zbMATH

1825 births
1903 deaths
Norwegian physicists
19th-century Norwegian mathematicians
Scientists from Oslo
Royal Norwegian Society of Sciences and Letters
Carl Anton
Members of the Göttingen Academy of Sciences and Humanities
Members of the Royal Society of Sciences in Uppsala
Norwegian mathematicians